Tales of Arcadia is a trilogy of American computer-animated science fantasy television series created for Netflix by Guillermo del Toro and produced by DreamWorks Animation and Double Dare You. It follows the inhabitants of the small suburban town of Arcadia Oaks, which is secretly home to various supernatural creatures and the teenage heroes who fight against the forces of evil that lurk in the shadows.

The following is a list of cast members who have appeared.

Cast and characters

See also 
 List of Tales of Arcadia characters

References 

Tales of Arcadia